Rewa Airport (IATA: REW, ICAO: none, GPS: VA1G), is an under-construction domestic airport, which will serve the city of Rewa, in the state of Madhya Pradesh, India. The airport is part of the government's UDAN regional connectivity scheme.

Development
The airport is currently used only by government, VIP, private aircraft and helicopters, and is owned by the Government of Madhya Pradesh. To boost connectivity and facilitate development in the Vindhya region, there are plans to expand the airport for starting commercial operations like increasing the runway's length and building a passenger terminal. The airport at present covers an area of about 62 acres, a runway of 1,400 metres with a small building of 150 sq.m. It will be expanded to 290 acres for making the airport suitable for handling ATR-72 type aircraft operations in future. Out of 290 acres of land, 137 acres are required for VFR operations and 153 acres are required for IFR operations. The state cabinet has approved the proposal to acquire 246 acres of private land and approved the compensation of ₹ 206 crore towards payment to the landowners. The State Government has handed over the existing airport to the Airport Authority of India (AAI) for the revival and construction of facilities. The total cost of the expansion project would be ₹ 300 crores. The total area of the under construction terminal building would be 750 sq.m. 

The airport will become operational in July 2023 with first flight of an ATR-72 aircraft is expected to take off, but the destination is not decided yet. The foundation stone for the expansion project was done by the Civil Aviation Minister, Jyotiraditya Scindia and the Chief Minister of Madhya Pradesh, Shivraj Singh Chauhan on 15 February 2023. By March 2024, the airport will be connected directly with Bhopal, Indore, New Delhi and Mumbai in the present stage, which can be extended to some other destinations later, by December 2024. The airport will boost Rewa's economy and create more employment occasions. It will be facilitate for Rewa district tourism, also known as "The Land of White Tigers," once the airport starts operations. The expansion project will be completed by 2025.

References

Airports in Madhya Pradesh